George Boyce (December 21, 1848 – February 28, 1930) was a Canadian politician and farmer. He was elected to the House of Commons of Canada as a Member of the Unionist Party coalition to represent the riding of Carleton. He was also reeve of Nepean Township, Ontario for two years and councillor for Carleton County, Ontario for twelve years.

References
 

1848 births
1930 deaths
Members of the House of Commons of Canada from Ontario
Ontario municipal councillors
Unionist Party (Canada) MPs